The South Yadkin River is a  long river that flows through Alexander, Davie, Iredell, Rowan, and Wilkes counties of North Carolina.  The mouth is located north of High Rock Lake, where the South Yadkin River meets the Yadkin River.  Major cities along the course of the South Yadkin River include, Statesville in Iredell County and Cooleemee in Davie County.  The South Yadkin River forms the border of Davie and Rowan counties.  High Rock Lake begins at the confluence of the South Yadkin River and the similarly named and larger Yadkin River.

Tributaries
Major tributaries of the South Yadkin River include:
 Hunting Creek
 Fourth Creek (see also Fourth Creek Congregation)
 Third Creek
 Second Creek and tributaries: Withrow's Creek, Back Creek, Cathy's Creek, and Sill's Creek

Sill's Creek was named for an early settler, John Sill, who settled there in 1749.   Cathy's Creek was named for James Cathey, another early Rowan County settler.  The Back Creek Presbyterian Church, named for the Creek, was founded in 1805.

External links
USGS flow data for the South Yadkin River

References

Rivers of North Carolina
Rivers of Alexander County, North Carolina
Rivers of Davie County, North Carolina
Rivers of Iredell County, North Carolina
Rivers of Rowan County, North Carolina
Rivers of Wilkes County, North Carolina
Tributaries of the Pee Dee River